Tineretului statue (also called Fallen Angel, Alata or the Straja Youth Monument) is a monument in Romania near the Danube–Black Sea Canal, designed by Pavel Bucur.

Description
The monument is dedicated to the Union of Communist Youth. The stainless steel structure rests on a three-sided concrete base. According to the designer, the form is an abstraction of a flame, which represents the body of a fallen angel. The original design included a pair of wings, but they were not installed, due to concerns about their structural integrity.

Vandalism
Bronze plates with bas-reliefs once covered the concrete base. They depicted the construction of the canal, and politicians Elena Ceaușescu and Nicolae Ceaușescu. The bronze plates were estimated to weigh between 5 and 19 tons. One of the original inscriptions makes reference to the labor camps that were used to build the canal. It reads (in Romanian): 
Steel plates have also been removed, and parts of the statue have been painted with graffiti. Some of the bronze plates were recovered from a recycling center.

References

Outdoor sculptures in Romania
Buildings and structures completed in 1987
1987 in Romania
1987 sculptures